Mamitschka is a 1955 West German comedy-drama film directed by Rolf Thiele and starring Mila Kopp, Rudolf Platte and Jester Naefe.

It was shot at the Göttingen Studios and on location around Bamberg in Bavaria. The film's sets were designed by the art director Walter Haag.

Plot
The film portrays the attempts of a family of Sudeten German refugees struggling to adjust to living in post-war Germany following their forced expulsion from Czechoslovakia. Eventually their daughter marries a soldier of the American occupying forces, himself of German descent, and the whole family emigrate to the United States.

Cast
Mila Kopp as Mamitschka
Rudolf Platte as Tatinek
Jester Naefe as Rosa
Karl Hackenber as Frantek
Ida Krottendorf as Nozena
Evi Kent as Olga
Dieter Thiele as Joseph
Michael Hahn as Poldi
Robert Haller as Baldur
Klaus Behrendt as Wilborn
Paul Henckels as Herr Samhaber
Margarethe Andersen as Frau Samhaber
Irka Peter as Witwe Nickel
Kurt A. Jung as Herr Merkel
Tilo von Berlepsch as Baron Hiebel
Ursula Grabley as Frau Hiebel
Gerd Frickhöffer as Geschäftsführer
Ilse Künkele as Frau Duckheberle

References

External links

1955 comedy films
German comedy films
West German films
Films directed by Rolf Thiele
Films shot in Bavaria
Films about refugees
1950s German-language films
German black-and-white films
1950s German films
Films shot at Göttingen Studios